Erich Klossowski or Kłossowski (19 December 1875 – 23 January 1949) was a German and Polish-French art historian and a painter, now primarily known as the father of the writer-philosopher- painter and actor Pierre Klossowski and the artist Balthus. He was born in Ragnit, Germany.

He came from a family which  belonged to  Polish  nobility (drobna szlachta), bearing the Rola coat-of-arms and living in the Prussian part of today's Poland. His son Balthus added "de Rola" to his family name.

Erich Klossowski wrote (in German) one of the early monographs on Honoré Daumier, first published in Munich in 1908 and again in 1914. He married the artist Baladine Klossowska, whom Rainer Maria Rilke called "Merline." Later, the couple moved to Paris.

He died in Sanary-sur-Mer on 23 January 1949.

Works
La collection Cheramy; catalogue raisonné précédé d'études sur les maîtres principaux de la collection, par J. Meier-Graefe et E. Klossowski; illustré de 127 héliotypies et de 2 héliogravures hors texte. Munich, R. Piper et Cie, 1908 (Contents Les peintres anglais et Constable, par J. Meier-Graefe.—Eugène Delacroix, par E. Klossowski.—La collection Cheramy, par J. Meier-Graefe.—Catalogue des tableaux anciens.—Catalogue des tableaux de l'école anglaise.—Catalogue des tableaux de l'école française)

References
Honoré Daumier, Erich Klossowski, Munich: R. Piper, 1923

1875 births
1949 deaths
German art historians
Polish art historians
French art historians
German artists
19th-century Polish painters
19th-century German male artists
20th-century Polish painters
20th-century French male artists
19th-century French painters
French male painters
20th-century French painters
19th-century Polish nobility
French male non-fiction writers
German male non-fiction writers
Polish male painters
19th-century French male artists
20th-century Polish nobility